T. Rathinavel (born January 1, 1951 ; Srivilliputhur, District- Virudhunagar (Tamil Nadu)) is a politician. He is a Member of Parliament, representing Tamil Nadu in the Rajya Sabha (the upper house of India's Parliament).

He belongs to the Indian Anna Dravida Munnetra Kazhagam (ADMK) political party.

See also
Rajya Sabha members from Tamil Nadu

References

1951 births
Living people
All India Anna Dravida Munnetra Kazhagam politicians
Lok Sabha members from Tamil Nadu
Rajya Sabha members from Tamil Nadu
People from Virudhunagar district
Tamil Nadu MLAs 1991–1996